Events from the year 1720 in Ireland.

Incumbent
Monarch: George I

Events
March 26 – the Parliament of Great Britain passes the Dependency of Ireland on Great Britain Act 1719 [that is, 1719 Old Style, meaning 1720 in New Style dating], also known as the Declaratory Act 1720, declaring the right of the Parliament of Great Britain to legislate for Ireland and denying the appellate jurisdiction of the Irish House of Lords.
Dr Steevens' Hospital is established at Kilmainham, Dublin.
The Royal Cork Yacht Club is established as the Water Club of the Cork Harbour by William O'Brien, 4th Earl of Inchiquin; it is widely acknowledged as the world's oldest yacht club.
Jonathan Swift publishes Proposal for Universal Use of Irish Manufacture.

Births
October 1 – Hector Theophilus de Cramahé, Lieutenant-Governor of Province of Quebec, and Lieutenant Governor of Detroit (d. 1788 in England)
October 9 – Andrew Lewis, pioneer, surveyor and soldier in Virginia (d. 1781)
October 18 – Peg Woffington, actress (d. 1760 in England)
Full date unknown
Patrick Browne, physician and botanist (d. 1790)
Ambrose Bernard O'Higgins, afterwards Ambrosio O'Higgins, 1st Marquis of Osorno, Spanish colonial administrator (d. 1801 in Peru)
Seamus McMurphy, poet and outlaw (d. 1750)

Deaths
August 18 – Matthew Aylmer, 1st Baron Aylmer, Admiral of the Royal Navy (b. c.1650)

References

 
Years of the 18th century in Ireland
Ireland
1720s in Ireland